Liptena seyboui, the Seybou's ochre liptena, is a butterfly in the family Lycaenidae. It is found in eastern Ivory Coast and western Ghana. The habitat consists of dense primary forests.

Etymology
The species is named for Seybou Lingani, a collector working for Haydon Warren-Gash.

References

Butterflies described in 2003
Liptena